Prohibition in Canada was a ban on alcoholic beverages that arose in various stages, from local municipal bans in the late 19th century (extending to the present in some cases), to provincial bans in the early 20th century, and national prohibition (a temporary wartime measure) from 1918 to 1920. The relatively large and powerful beer and alcohol manufacturing sector, and the huge working class that purchased their products, failed to convince any of the governments to reverse their stance on prohibition. Most provinces repealed their bans in the 1920s, though alcohol was illegal in Prince Edward Island from 1901 to 1948. By comparison, Ontario's temperance act was in effect from 1916 to 1927.

As legislation prohibiting the consumption of alcohol was repealed, it was typically replaced with regulation imposing restrictions on the sale of alcohol to minors, and with excise taxes on alcoholic products.

Origins

Temperance movement

Canadians drank heavily during the nineteenth century. The Upper Canadian census of 1851 recorded 1,999 taverns or one to  478 people. Drunkenness, fighting, domestic abuse, and household impoverishment were rampant.

Prohibition was mostly spurred on by the organized crusades against social evil launched by the temperance movement. They targeted drinking establishments, which they viewed as the source of societal ills and misery. Initially, the temperance movement in Canada, which began in the 1820s, was largely concerned with the consumption of strong liquor, while beer, wine, and cider were not considered to be a significant problem. However, by the 1840s, "total abstinence" temperance societies were the norm, and all alcoholic beverages, including those with lighter alcohol content, were considered dangerous. Inspired by the Maine Law of 1851, which saw legal prohibition in the US state of Maine, the temperance movement in Canada shifted to the strategy of legal coercion to advance the cause of sobriety.

The main temperance organizations that emerged at the beginning of the prohibition era in Canada were the Dominion Alliance for the Total Suppression of the Liquor Traffic and the Woman's Christian Temperance Union (WCTU) of Canada. Protestant denominations, including Baptists, Methodists, Presbyterians and Congregationalists, generally supported prohibition and campaigned for it beginning in the late 19th century. Prohibition was an important aspect of the Protestant Social Gospel.

The WCTU established itself throughout much of Canada and the United States as one of the largest and most influential contributors to the temperance movement. One way the WCTU attempted to spread the message of temperance was by pressuring provincial governments for temperance instruction in schools. In 1892, under pressure from the WCTU and other temperance organizations, Nova Scotia enacted legislation requiring schools to teach students about the effects of alcohol on the human body. By the end of the 19th century, through the efforts of the WCTU, most provinces had at least some temperance instruction in school. The WCTU also looked outside of the formal school systems to promote temperance ideals to children, and also spread their message to Sunday schools, and youth groups.

The Dominion Alliance was an umbrella organization that "included representatives from most temperance and prohibition societies," including the WCTU. The group lobbied governments at various levels to enact prohibitory laws, and other legislation that advanced the cause of temperance. They submitted a memorial, or a written statement of principles, to the nineteenth session of the Huron Diocese's Anglican Synod in 1876. In it they stated:"The Council of the Alliance has agreed to the following principles as a basis to which they most respectfully but earnestly call your attention:

"DECLARATION OF PRINCIPLES.

"1. That it is neither right nor politic for the Government to afford legal protection and sanction to any traffic or system that tends to increase crime, to waste the resources of the Dominion, to corrupt the social habits, and to destroy the healths and lives of the people.

"2. That the traffic in intoxicating liquors as common beverages is inimical to the true interests of individuals, and destructive of the order and welfare of society, and ought therefore to be prohibited.

"3. That the history and results of all legislation in regard to the liquor traffic abundantly prove, that it is impossible satisfactorily to limit or regulate a system so essentially mischievous in its tendencies.

"4. That no consideration of private gain or public revenue can justify the upholding of a traffic so thoroughly wrong in principle, so suicidal in policy, and disastrous in its results, as the traffic in intoxicating liquors.

"5. That the Legislative Prohibition of the liquor traffic is perfectly compatible with national liberty, and with the claims of justice and legitimate commerce.

"6. That the Legislative Prohibition of the liquor traffic would be highly conducive to the development of progressive civilization.

"7. That rising above sectarian and party considerations, all good citizens should combine to procure an enactment prohibiting the manufacture and sale of intoxicating beverages, as affording the most efficient aid in removing the appalling evils of intemperance."

"There may be differences of opinion in regard to the foregoing particulars, but the Council assures the Christian Body it has now the honor to approach, that the utmost diligence has been exercised in the examination of evidence on all the subjects embraced therein.

"Deeply convinced of the value of the aid of Christian Ministers and Churches, as such, we solicit your co-operation in the efforts now being made to concentrate the moral and religious energies of the Dominion against the liquor traffic.

"Your memorialists most earnestly hope that your counsels may be wisely directed, and that you will take such action in the premises as may strengthen the hands and encourage the hearts of those who have the direction of the Prohibitory Liquor Law movement."

Legislation

Local option
Some legislative steps toward prohibition were taken in the 19th century. The passage of the Canada Temperance Act of 1864, also called the "Dunkin Act", in the Province of Canada, allowed any county or city to forbid the sale of liquor by majority vote. After Canadian Confederation, local option was extended to the rest of Canada via the Canada Temperance Act of 1878. It was often known as the Scott Act after its sponsor Sir Richard William Scott. It also allowed any county or city to opt in to a prohibitionist scheme if there was a bare majority in a local vote. Under the CTA, the sale of alcohol for sacramental or medicinal usage remained legal.

Local option votes resulted in more than 240 places in Ontario being under local option prohibition by 1912.

The Cardston, Alberta, licence district, which included the town and surrounding countryside, voted in favour of local option prohibition in 1902.

Failed referendum
An official, but non-binding, federal referendum on prohibition was held in 1898. 51 percent voted in favour of prohibition, and 49 percent voted against. Voter turnout was low at 44 percent. Prohibition had a majority in all provinces except Quebec, where a strong 80 percent of the population voted against it. The main factor was religion. Pietistic Protestants, such as Methodists, Presbyterians and Scandinavian Lutherans, were strongly in support.  Liturgical or high church Protestants, such as Anglicans and German Lutherans were in opposition; the Catholic population, both French and Irish, strongly opposed. Urban areas were more opposed than rural, but economic wealth made little difference.  Despite a prohibition majority, Prime Minister Wilfrid Laurier's government chose not to introduce a federal bill on prohibition, because of strong opposition in Quebec, and low voter turnout. As a result, prohibition in Canada would only be enacted through individual sets of laws passed at the provincial level during the first twenty years of the 20th century.

Provincial and federal prohibition

In 1900–1919, one province after another went "dry." In March 1918 the federal government as a war measure made it illegal to manufacture "intoxicating" drinks.  Most of the provinces enacted prohibition during the First World War, and opted to extend the ban on alcohol following the end of the war.  Between 1878 and 1928 about 75% of Canadian breweries had closed. Notable extremes were Prince Edward Island which implemented prohibition as early as 1901, and Quebec which adopted prohibition in 1919 but quickly repealed it after intense public pressure.

The First World War was an important factor in the success of prohibition efforts in Canada at the beginning of the 20th century. Many believed that prohibition would create a Canadian society worthy of the sacrifices of soldiers overseas. The argument was also raised that prohibition would benefit the war effort since it would prevent waste and inefficiency. Some also considered the barroom a place where "foreigners" congregated and "plotted" against the British Empire, and therefore the war effort. As former opponents of prohibition became silenced, lest they be judged as unpatriotic, provinces began to implement prohibition.

Following the election of 1917 the federal government introduced national prohibition by an Order in Council that became effective on April 1, 1918. It prohibited the importation of alcohol of more than 2.5 percent into Canada, the inter-provincial trade of alcohol, and included a ban on production. The wartime ban expired a year after the conclusion of the war. This was the first and last time that national prohibition on the production, distribution, and consumption of alcohol was enacted in Canada.

First Nations
Indigenous peoples in Canada were subject to prohibitory alcohol laws under the Indian Act of 1876. This was an attempt on the part of the Canadian government to facilitate assimilation, because for an indigenous person to possess alcohol they had to become a Canadian citizen through enfranchisement and to be eligible for enfranchisement indigenous people had to demonstrate sobriety. The laws also reflected a widespread false belief among North Americans, that indigenous peoples were more prone to alcohol dependency, known as the "firewater myth." Sections of the Indian Act regarding liquor were not repealed for over a hundred years, until 1985.

Alcohol production in Ontario
Despite having prohibition from 1916 until 1927 in Ontario, the government allowed for numerous exceptions. Wineries were exempted from closure, and various breweries and distilleries remained open for the export market. In Hamilton, Ontario, Rocco Perri specialized in exporting liquor from old Canadian distilleries, such as Seagram and Gooderham and Worts, to the United States, and helped these companies obtain a large share of the American market. In London, Ontario, Harry Low and his group of rum-runners bought the Carling Brewery, while the Labatt family left the operations to the manager Edmund Burke. The fact that the "export" might be by small boat from Windsor across the river to Detroit only helped the province's economy. Rum-running occurred in other provinces as well.

Repeal
The dates for the repeal of prohibition are often debated. Throughout the prohibition period, Ontario-made wines remained legal in Ontario and some have argued that Ontario never had prohibition. The government allowed the sale of light beer, considered to be non-intoxicating (and generally reviled by drinkers) in 1923, but it did not repeal the legislation creating prohibition until 1927, replacing it with the Liquor Control Act and creating the Liquor Control Board of Ontario to enforce the Act. Although some might argue the light beer amendment of 1923 ended prohibition, there is a general consensus among recent historians that 1927 is the date of repeal. Similar debates can be made across the country. This table should not be taken as definitive, but rather one interpretation of prohibition's end points.

Between the years of 1920–1925 five provinces voted to repeal prohibition. The elimination of alcoholic beverages had made a difference in Canadian society. The Ontario Alliance for the Total Suppression of the Liquor Trade stated in 1922 that the number of convictions for offenses associated with drink had declined from 17,413 in 1914 to 5,413 in 1921, and drunkenness cases had dropped from 16,590 in 1915 to 6,766 in 1921. By the end of prohibition, nearly three quarters of beer breweries had closed. It was only in the second half of the twentieth century that a significant number of new breweries opened again.

After the First World War, opponents of prohibition claimed that too many people were ignoring the law and drinking illegally, and that prohibition contributed to the expansion of organized crime and violence. The new slogans were 'Moderation' and 'Government Regulation.' Moreover, the denominations of Presbyterianism, Methodism, and Congregationalism voted to merge  as the United Church of Canada, to create a stronger liberal voice. The possibility of new revenue led several provinces to introduce government control on the sale of alcohol and by the mid-1920s prohibition was fighting a losing battle.

Most provinces repealed their prohibition laws during the 1920s. After the 1924 Ontario prohibition referendum narrowly upheld prohibition under the Ontario Temperance Act (OTA), the Ontario government led by Howard Ferguson permitted the sale of low-alcohol beer. Ferguson's successful re-election platform in 1926 included a repeal of the OTA. Prohibition was ended in 1927 following the election, and the Liquor Control Act (LCA) was passed supplanting the OTA. The Liquor Control Board of Ontario (LCBO) was created to enforce the LCA by "controlling the sale of liquor to the public and the regulation of the places in which people could drink their booze." The Liquor Control Act of 1927 allowed for the sale of alcoholic beverages for individual purchase, but public drinking of full strength alcohol (in pubs, taverns, restaurants, beverage rooms) remained illegal. Subsequently, the Liquor Control Act of 1934 permitted public drinking, but only in hotel beverage rooms where beer was permitted, and dining rooms where beer and wine was permitted with meals.

Since each province had its own laws, any attempt to generalize liquor control legislation distorts the situation. Quebec repealed prohibition in 1919; British Columbia in 1921, and this rolled across the country roughly west to east. Quebec had a more liberal system than most places in North America at the time. They legalized the sale of light beer, cider, and wine in hotels, taverns, cafes, clubs and corner stores in 1919. Two years later, faced with extensive smuggling of hard liquors, the province legalized the sale of spirits in government run stores. 

Quebec, a convenient train ride from the eastern seaboard of the United States, became a mecca for thirsty Americans, even inspiring the song "Hello Montreal." British Columbia's new law initially covered only public sale in stores. Public drinking remained illegal until 1925, when "beer by the glass" legislation permitted beer parlours to open in hotels. 

Alberta repealed prohibition in 1924, along with Saskatchewan, upon realizing that the laws were enforceable only at great expense. Alberta replaced Prohibition with government-store sales of hard liquor and beer "parlours" selling beer under strict conditions.

Prince Edward Island was the last province to repeal prohibition in 1948.

Despite the lifting of provincial Prohibition laws, it still remained illegal for most types of liquor to be shipped across provincial borders, under the Importation of Intoxicating Liquors Act, into the 21st century. In response, Okanagan MP Dan Albas tabled Bill C-311, which would repeal this restriction and allow the interprovincial distribution of wine (but not beer or spirits). With the promise of potential for increased investment in Canada's wine industry if the restrictions were lifted (owing to wineries finally being able to distribute their product nationally), the bill passed the House with a vote of 287–0 in June 2012. However, the exemption created by the amendment is subject to the laws of the province into which the wine is being shipped. So far, the provinces have responded inconsistently. For example, Ontario and British Columbia have permitted the interprovincial transport of wine on the person (up to one case), but have made no law or policy that allows interprovincial shipment of wine.

Dry communities in Canada

Municipalities in Canada that have prohibited or restricted sale of alcohol within their borders:

Alberta
 Cardston County, the western portion of the Warner County and the communities contained within their boundaries do not allow standing licenses for sale of liquor within their limits. This area includes the communities of Cardston, Raymond, Magrath and Stirling.

In 2022 Raymond considered allowing alcohol sales. "In June of 2020, the province removed the last vestiges of the Prohibition Act and when that happened, Raymond went from prohibited community to a community without licence,” said Kurtis Pratt, Raymond’s chief administrative officer.

Manitoba
 Steinbach did not allow the sale of liquor within city limits until 2011.

Newfoundland and Labrador
 Natuashish, a federal Indian reserve, voted to ban alcohol in 2008, and a vote to repeal the ban in 2010 was not successful.

Northwest Territories
 , there are seven dry communities: Behchoko, Gamèti, Lutselk'e, Nahanni Butte, Tsiigehtchic, Wekweeti and Whatì. 
 , there are also communities where the amount of alcohol is limited. These are Deline, Dettah, Fort Good Hope, Fort Liard, Fort McPherson, Paulatuk, Trout Lake, Tuktoyaktuk, Tulita and Ulukhaktok.
 , there are seven liquor stores in the Territory.

Nunavut
 As of 2019, six communities in Nunavut are dry. These are Arviat, Coral Harbour, Gjoa Haven, Kugaaruk, Pangnirtung, and Sanikiluaq. 

There are also 12 communities that operate the committee system. In these communities anybody wishing to purchase alcohol must obtain permission, including the quantity, from a locally elected Alcohol Education Committee (AEC), before they are allowed to order from Iqaluit (Baffin communities), Rankin Inlet (Kivalliq communities), or Yellowknife (Kitikmeot communities). These communities are Arctic Bay, Cape Dorset, Chesterfield Inlet, Clyde River, Hall Beach, Igloolik, Kimmirut, Naujaat (Repulse Bay), Pond Inlet, Qikiqtarjuaq, Resolute Bay, and Whale Cove. Seven communities are unrestricted: Baker Lake, Cambridge Bay, Grise Fiord, Iqaluit, Kugluktuk, Rankin Inlet, and Taloyoak.

In May 2022 the hamlet of Kugluktuk voted to return to limit on alcohol sales. A total of 287 votes were cast. This was equivalent to 38 percent of eligible voters in the community whose total population is approximately 1,400. Sixty per cent of those voters opted for restrictions, which exceeds the 60-per-cent threshold that was required for change.

Ontario
 Orillia ended prohibition in 1955.
 The city of Owen Sound continued to outlaw liquor well into the 1970s.
 Parts of west Toronto (see The Junction) did not permit liquor sales until 2000 due largely to the efforts of William Horace Temple that resulted in the ban from 1904 to 1998.
 James Bay Cree communities in Ontario remain dry as of 2016 (Moose Factory, Fort Albany, Kashechewan, Attawapiskat), Deer Lake First Nation; in that there is no government store selling alcoholic products. Restriction of the transport of alcohol into the communities is not generally enforced, and consumption is still common. Liquor sales are available in Moosonee, which is accessible from all communities by ice road in the winter.

Quebec
 James Bay Cree communities in Quebec, with the exception of Whapmagoostui, are still dry as of 2013 (Waskaganish, Eastmain, Wemindji, Chisasibi, Waswanipi, Mistissini, Oujé-Bougoumou and Nemaska). Chisasibi is unique in that it has a checkpoint for enforcing the ban on bringing alcohol into the village, although this is skirted by snowmobiles avoiding the main road.

Saskatchewan
 Govenlock After Montana's prohibition declaration in 1919, large groups of drinkers from that state frequently crossed the border by train to visit Govenlock to purchase booze. Govenlock is now a ghost town since 1976.

Yukon
 Old Crow is a dry Gwich'in community on the Porcupine River.
 Ross River is a dry community.

See also
 Whiskey Gap, Alberta
 Drug liberalization
 Prohibition in the United States
 Beer in Canada

Footnotes

References 
 Campbell, Robert A. “Profit was just a circumstance: The Evolution of Government Liquor Control in British Columbia, 1920-1988.” Drink in Canada: Historical Essays. Ed. Warsh, Cheryl Krasnick. Montreal, Quebec: McGill-Queen's University Press, 1993. 178–183. Print.

 Cook, Sharon Anne. (1995) Through Sunshine and Shadow: The Woman's Christian Temperance Union, Evangelicalism, and Reform in Ontario, 1874-1930 (McGill-Queen's Press-MQUP, 1995), in Canada.
 Cook, Sharon Anne. " 'Sowing Seed for the Master': The Ontario WCTU and Evangelical Feminism 1874-1930." Journal of Canadian studies 30.3 (1995): 175-194.

 
 Grant, George M. (1898). Principal Grant's letters on prohibition: as they appeared in the Toronto daily "Globe", December, 1897, January, 1898. Grant opposed prohibition.

 Noel, Jan. (2004). "Temperance Movement" The Oxford Companion to Canadian History. 2004.
 Warsh, Cheryl Krasnick. (2004). "Prohibition" The Oxford Companion to Canadian History. 2004.

 Sheehan, Nancy M. "National Pressure Groups and the provincial Curriculum Policy: Temperance in Nova Scotia Schools in 1880–1930," Canadian Journal of Education/Revenue Canadienne de l'éducation, no.1, (1984), p. 73-88
 Sheehan, Nancy M. "The WCTU and educational strategies on The Canadian Prairie," History of Education Quarterly, Vol.24, No.1, Spring 1984, p101-119 Spring 1984
 Sheehan, Nancy M. "Temperance, education and the WCTU in Alberta, 1905-1930." Journal of Educational Thought (JET)/Revue de la Pensée Educative 14.2 (1980): 108-124.

 
Alcohol in Canada
Alcohol law in Canada
Canada
Social history of Canada